The Science in Society Journalism Awards are awards created by the American National Association of Science Writers (NASW) to honor and encourage "outstanding investigative and interpretive reporting about the sciences and their impact for good and ill." Each year the NASW recognizes work in these categories:  books, periodicals (newspaper and magazine), and electronic media (radio, television, and the Internet). Each winner receives $2,500. The first award was given in 1972. The Awards recognize not only reporting about science, but also thoughtful work that probes the ethical problems and social effects of science. The awards are considered especially prestigious because they are judged by accomplished peers. Starting in 2009 the award categories were changed. The book category will remain unchanged, while the other categories will morph into "Commentary and Opinion," "Science Reporting," and "Local Science Reporting." Except for the Book category, the awards will be platform independent, which means that they may be magazine, radio, TV, or web-based.

Past recipients

2020
 Book: Katherine Eban for her book Bottle of Lies: The Inside Story of the Generic Drug Boom(Ecco/HarperCollins)
 Science Reporting: “Cigarette Butts Are Everywhere. Is Banning Filters a Viable Solution?" by Robin Kazmier published in Audubon
 Science Features: “The Confession: A psychologist has shown how police questioning can get innocent people to condemn themselves” by Douglas Starr, published in Science Magazine
 Longform: “The Final Five Percent” by Tim Requarth, published in Longreads
 Series: "Polluter's Paradise" by Tristan Baurick, Joan Meiners, Claire Perlman, Gordon Russell, Sara Sneath, Mark Schleifstein, Al Shaw and Lylla Younes, published by ProPublica and The Advocate

2019
 Book: Carl Zimmer for his book She Has Her Mother’s Laugh: The Powers, Perversions and Potentials of Heredity(Dutton)
 Science Reporting: “In the Land of Quakes, Engineering a Future for a Church Made of Mud" by Michelle Donahue published in The New York Times
 Science Features: “Scientists think Alabama’s sewage problem has caused a tropical parasite. The state has done little about it" by Arielle Duhaime-Ross, published in VICE News
 Longform: “Surrendering to Rising Sea” by Jen Schwartz, published in Scientific American
 Series: "Poisoned Cities, Deadly Border" by Ian James and Zoë Meyers in The Desert Sun

2018
 Book: Maryn McKenna for his book Big Chicken(National Geographic)
 Science Reporting - Short category: “The Mystery of the Wasting House-Cats” by Emily Anthes, published in The New York Times Magazine
 Science Reporting - Medium category: “Accidental Therapists: For Insect Detectives, the Trickiest Cases Involve the Bugs That Aren’t Really There” by Eric Boodman, published in STAT
 Science Reporting - Long category: “The Detective of Northern Oddities” by Christopher Solomon, published in Outside
 Science Reporting - Series: “United States of Climate Change,” by the United States of Climate Change Reporting Team, published by The Weather Channel Digital
 Local or Regional Science Reporting: “Doomed by Delay" by Patricia Callahan, published in Chicago Tribune

2017
 Book: Emily Voigt for her book The Dragon Behind the Glass: A True Story of Power, Obsession, and the World’s Most Coveted Fish (Scribner)
 Science Reporting: “Science for Sale” by David Heath and Jie Jenny Zou, published in Center for Public Integrity
 Longform: “Choking to Death in Detroit” by Zoë Schlanger, published in Newsweek
 Local or Regional Science Reporting: “When the Dust Settles" by Eva Hershaw, published in Texas Monthly
 Commentary or Opinion: “Not Just Death, a System Failure", by Barbara Moran published in The New York Times

2016
 Book: Andrew Nikiforuk for his book Slick Water: Fracking and One Insider's Stand Against the World's Most Powerful Industry (Greystone Books)
 Science Reporting: “How the Fight Against Ebola Tested a Culture’s Traditions” by Amy Maxmen, published in National Geographic
 Longform: “Bees, Inc.” by Josh Dzieza, published in Pacific Standard
 Local or Regional Science Reporting: “Leaving the Sea: Staten Islanders Experiment with Managed Retreat" by Elizabeth Rush, published in Urban Omnibus
 Commentary or Opinion: "Handle with Care", by Emma Marris published in Orion Magazine

2015
 Book: Judy Foreman for her book A Nation in Pain: Healing Our Biggest Health Problem (Oxford University Press)
 Science Reporting: “Why Nothing Works" by Erik Vance, published in Discover
 Longform: “Big Oil,Bad Air” by Lisa Song, David Hasemyer, Jim Morris, Greg Gilderman, and more than a dozen other colleagues, published in InsideClimate News
 Local or Regional Science Reporting: “Battle of the Ash Borer“ by Matthew Miller, published in Lansing State Journal
 Commentary or Opinion: No award was given

2014
 Book: Sheri Fink for her book Five Days At Memorial: Life and Death in a Storm-Ravaged Hospital (Crown Publishing Group)
 Science Reporting: “A Race to Save the Orange by Altering Its DNA," by Amy Harmon, published in The New York Times
 Longform: “Uprising: The Environmental Scandal That’s Happening Right Beneath Your Feet,” by Phil McKenna, published in Matter
 Local or Regional Science Reporting: “The Tree Coroners,“ by Cally Carswell, published in High Country News
 Commentary or Opinion: “23andMe is Terrifying, but Not for the Reasons the FDA Thinks,” by Charles Seife, published in Scientific American’s SA Forum

2013
 Book: David Quammen for his book Spillover: Animal Infections and the Next Human Pandemic (W.W. Norton)
 Science Reporting: “Witness to an Antarctic Meltdown” by freelancer Douglas Fox, published in Scientific American
 Longform: "Playing with Fire” by Patricia Callahan, Sam Roe and Michael Hawthorne, published in the Chicago Tribune
 Local or Regional Science Reporting: “The Color of Bunny” by freelancer Hillary Rosner, published in High Country News
 Commentary or Opinion: “The Real Scandal” by freelancer Christie Aschwanden, posted on the blog The Last Word on Nothing

2012
 Book: Seth Mnookin for his book Panic Virus: A True Story of Medicine, Science, and Fear (Simon & Schuster)
 Science Reporting: "Poisoned Places," by reporters from the Center for Public Integrity (Jim Morris, Chris Hamby, Ronnie Greene, Elizabeth Lucas, Emma Schwartz) and NPR (Elizabeth Shogren, Howard Berkes, Sandra Bartlett, John Poole, Robert Benincasa)
 Local or Regional Science Reporting:"Perilous Passages," by Emilene Ostlind, Mary Ellen Hannibal, and Cally Carswell, published in High Country News
 Commentary or Opinion:  "Ban Chimp Testing," by the Scientific American Board of Editors, published in Scientific American

2011
 Book: Maryn McKenna for her book Superbug: The Fatal Menace of MRSA (Free Press)
 Science Reporting: Katy Butler for her New York Times Magazine article, “My Father’s Broken Heart”
 Local or Regional Science Reporting: Barbara Moran for her Boston Globe Magazine article, “Power Politics”
 Commentary or Opinion: Charles Homans, for his Columbia Journalism Review article, “Hot Air”

2010
 Book: Susan Cohen and Christine Cosgrove for Normal at Any Cost: Tall Girls, Short Boys, and the Medical Industry’s Quest to Manipulate Height (Tarcher/Penguin)
 Science Reporting: Martha Mendoza and Margie Mason won for their Associated Press series “When Drugs Stop Working”
 Science Reporting: Charles Duhigg won for his New York Times series “Toxic Waters”
 Local or Regional Science Reporting: J. Madeleine Nash for her article “Bring in the Cows,” which appeared in High Country News

There was not an award in the Commentary or Opinion category in 2010.

2009
 Book: Alison Bass for her book Side Effects: A Prosecutor, a Whistleblower, and a Bestselling Antidepressant on Trial
 Science Reporting: Jason Felch and Maura Dolan for their series in the Los Angeles Times, "Genes as Evidence"
 Local or Regional Science Reporting: Michael J. Berens and Ken Armstrong for their series in the Seattle Times, "Culture of Resistance"
 Commentary: Pamela Ronald for "The New Organic," which appeared on boston.com

2008
 Book: Liza Mundy for her book Everything Conceivable: How Assisted Reproduction Is Changing Men and Women and the World (Knopf)
 Magazine: Beth Whitehouse for her Newsday series "The Match"
 Broadcast: Stephen Lyons and Llewellyn M. Smith for their docudrama "Forgotten Genius," which appeared on PBS's NOVA television series.

2007
 Book: Nicholas Wade for Before the Dawn: Recovering the Lost History of Our Ancestors (Penguin Books)
 Broadcast: David Sington for his documentary "Dimming the Sun," which appeared on PBS's NOVA television series.
 Newspaper: Kenneth Weiss and Usha Lee McFarling for their Los Angeles Times series "Altered Oceans"

2005
 Book: Robin Marantz Henig for Pandora's Baby: How the First Test-Tube Babies Sparked the Reproductive Revolution
 Broadcast: Craig Duff and Andrew Revkin for Arctic Rush (a New York Times/ Discovery Channel/CBC Documentary)
 Magazine: Laurie Garrett for "The Next Pandemic" Foreign Affairs July/August 2005
 Newspaper: Jim Erickson "A Change in the Air" Rocky Mountain News December 13, 2005
 Web: Daniel Grossman Fantastic Forests: The Balance Between Nature and People of Madagascar , WBUR

2004
 Book: Stephen S. Hall Merchants of Immortality: Chasing the Dream of Human Life Extension 
 Magazine: Robin Marantz Henig “The Quest to Forget” The New York Times Magazine
 Newspaper: Alexandra Witze and Tom Siegfried "Science’s Big Unknown" series The Dallas Morning News
 Broadcast: Noel Schwerin Bloodlines: Technology Hits Home Backbone Media

2003
 Book: Steve Olson Mapping Human History
 Magazine: Kyla Dunn “Cloning Trevor” The Atlantic Monthly
 Newspaper: Dan Fagin “Tattered Hopes” series Newsday
 Radio: Joe Palca “Stem Cells” series National Public Radio (NPR)
 Television: John Rubin “Clone” MSNBC-National Geographic Explorer
 Web: Margaret A. Woodbury “A Doctor’s Right to Choose” Salon.com

2002
 Book: Jon Cohen Shots in the Dark: The Wayward Search for an AIDS Vaccine
 Magazine: Shannon Brownlee “The Big Fat Question” Self magazine
 Magazine: Charles W. Schmidt “e-Junk Explosion” Environmental Health Perspectives
 Newspaper: Rick Weiss “Building a New Child: Embryo Screening Creates a Tool Against Disease — and Ethical Questions” The Washington Post
 Radio: William S. Hammack Engineering and Life WILL-AM580 and Illinois Public Radio
 Television: Richard Hutton Evolution NOVA/WGBH-TV
 Web: Alan Boyle “Genetic Genealogy” MSNBC

2001
 Book: David Dobbs The Great Gulf
 Magazine: Gary Taubes “The Soft Science of Dietary Fat” Science
 Newspaper: Sabin Russell, Reynolds Holding, Elizabeth Fernandez “Breakdowns mar flu shot program” “Waiting for shots” San Francisco Chronicle
 Television: Betsey Arledge, Julia Cort, Robert Krulwich, NOVA “Cracking the Code of Life” NOVA/WGBH-TV
 Web: David Tenenbaum “Energy Crisis III?” The Why Files

References

Science communication awards
Science writing awards
American journalism awards
American science and technology awards